Goltz is a surname. Notable people with the surname include: 

Bogumil Goltz (1801–1870), German humorist and satirist 
Boris Goltz (1913–1942), Soviet composer
Christel Goltz (1912–2008), German operatic soprano
Dave Goltz (born 1949), American baseball player
Franziska Goltz (born 1985), German sports sailor
Friedrich Goltz (1834–1902), German physiologist
Hans Goltz (1873–1927), German art dealer
Hendrick Goltz (1558–1617), German-born Dutch printmaker and artist
Hubert Goltz (1526–1583), Dutch printmaker and artist
Justin Goltz (born 1987), American football player
Paolo Goltz (born 1985), Argentine football player 
Rick Goltz (born 1955), Canadian football player
Thomas Goltz (born 1954), American author and journalist
Ursula Goltz, German computer scientist

See also
von der Goltz, surname of several noble Germans